Joe Byrne Memorial Stadium is a multi-purpose arena located on Jones Street, adjacent to High Street, in Grand Falls-Windsor, Newfoundland and Labrador. The stadium is used to host trade shows, conferences, sporting events and special events. The ice arena was constructed in 1947/48 and was known as the Grand Falls Stadium until 1991.

Construction
The Anglo-Newfoundland Development Company built and owned the Grand Falls Stadium. The town of Grand Falls was incorporated in 1961 and that year bought the stadium from the company.

Opening
The first performance at the new stadium was a children's ice carnival followed by a figure skating exhibition by two Murphy sisters from Corner Brook on February 12, 1948. Approximately 2,300 spectators attended the stadium's first event. The official opening of the stadium was on November 22, 1948. An exhibition game was played between two teams from the Maritime Senior Hockey League, the Halifax Crescents and the Halifax St. Mary's.

When the stadium first opened, and until late 1954 when St. John's Memorial Stadium was completed, it was the only regulation-size artificial ice surface in Newfoundland and could accommodate 2,500 spectators.

Stadium Managers
Edgar M. "Top" Way
William J. (Bill) Short, 1959
Harv Beson

Memorial to Joseph Byrne
On March 22, 1991 the stadium was renamed as a memorial to Joe Byrne, on what would have been his 70th birthday, in recognition of his lifelong contribution to sports in the community and the province. Byrne, a Quebec City native, was hired by the Grand Falls Athletic Association to coach their hockey team and moved to the papertown in December 1949. He died in August 1990 at Grand Falls.

References

Bibliography

External links 
 Official Site

Ice hockey venues in Newfoundland and Labrador
Sports venues in Newfoundland and Labrador
Grand Falls-Windsor
Indoor ice hockey venues in Canada
Indoor arenas in Newfoundland and Labrador
Ice hockey in Newfoundland and Labrador